Suitcase Four: Captain Kangaroo Won the War is the fourth box set of unreleased music by the Dayton, Ohio band Guided by Voices. The collection is compiled in the same manner as the previous three suitcase box sets, with 100 songs spanning four discs complete with fictional band names for each track. The music ranges from demos of classic tracks to studio outtakes and song sketches.

Track listing

Disc 1
 Unruly Compounds  -  Lead Walking Shorts	 
 Jump The Swing  -  Walls And Windows	 
  Jonathon Hyphen Jones  -  I'm In Shock (Hit Me With Tonic)	 
  Vile Typists  -  Deaf Dumb And Blind Girl	 
  Rachel Twit  -  Try Me On For Size	 
  Laser Finch  -  No One Looking For You	  
  Crowd, The  -  Murphy Had A Birthday	 
  Zeppelins Of Gin  -  Living On Planet Cake	 
  Jonathon Hyphen Jones  -  Great Service	 
  Baby Gods  -  Only Ghost In Town	 
  Teenage Guitar  -  8 Bars (Ext 3)	 
  Target Larks  -  No Bird	 
  Broken Heart Discothèque  -  Motor Away [Quiet Demo]	 
  Canoes  -  The Garden	 
  Jonathon Hyphen Jones  -  Happy Heartbreaker	 
  Pretzel Youth  -  Less Active Railroad	 
  Porky Giant (w/ Jumbo)  -  Porpoise Northeast	 
  Human Possible, The  -  Pretty Pinwheel	 
  Die City  -  Back To The Diving Board	 
  Dashing Plumbers  -  Mary And The Summer	 
  Crowd, The  -  Eloise	 
  Abigail French  -  Here To Stay	
  Human Brain  -  She It	 
  Christopher Lightship  -  Hallway Of Shatterproof Glass	 
  Nile Eskimo  -  Govt. Bldg. 15

Disc 2
  Once  -  Lockets Of The Empress	 
  Red Gravity  -  The New Ooze	 
  Invalid Keys  -  Our Little Secret	 
  Jonathon Hyphen Jones  -  I Can Never Let You Win	
  Cracked Heads, The  -  Hey You Know Me [Live]	 
  Demmit Runyon  -  Ode To J.D.	 
  1913 Floods, The  -  I Am Decided [Alternate Mix]	 
  Science Of Lamar  -  Over And Over Again	 
  Multi-Colored Wisemen, The  -  Excellent Extension	 
  Up The Family Tree  -  Good To Look	 
  Witches Of Woodstock  -  Slave Boss Cranberry [Live]	 
  Average Roger  -  Slow Dirty Water	 
  Jonathon Hyphen Jones  -  The Garden Goes	 
  Punchin Umps  -  Save My Life [Live]	 
  Obligated Finger  -  Somethings Missing	 
  Crystal Rabbit  -  Clean It Up
  Anvil Cranberry  -  You Don't Know Me (I'm Your Dog)	 
  Jonathon Hyphen Jones  -  You Make The Sun	 
  Crowd, The  -  Time Will Destroy You	 
  Fire Engine John  -  Delayed Reaction Brats [Demo]	 
  Jonathon Hyphen Jones  -  Pretty As Her Cats	 
  Sobers  -  One Big Boss	 
  Human Possible, The  -  Mystery Walk	 
  Crowd, The  -  Then Again	 
  The Sunflower Logic  -  Son Of The Sea

Disc 3
  Union Bellboy  -  Bellboy Stomp	 
  Crowd, The  -  Linda's Lottery	 
  Jonathon Hyphen Jones  -  Of Course You Are [Demo]	 
  Poof  -  Pinpoints On The Anal Zone	 
  Eyeball Magazine  -  City With Fear	 
  Stonehenge Birdhouse  -  She Doesn't Know Why	 
  Greenish Monsoon  -  (I Been) Pigeon Tripping	 
  The Peter Pan Can  -  Fall All Over Yourself	 
  Pontiac Seagulls  -  Quality Of Armor [Very Early Version]	 
  Pete Star  -  Teeth Flashlight [Demo]	 
  Hoarse Gorilla  -  Let's Make Out	 
  Bob Silky  -  Busy Bee	 
  The Sunflower Logic  -  Why Do You Stare Into The Sea	 
  Boy Rocker  -  Rock Time	 
  Canoes  -  Heartbeat	  
  Amazed By Extra Indians  -  Near As Not Late	 
  Abigail French  -  Finger To The Lips	 
  Mousetrap Speaker  -  Carnal Limousine	 
  Faint Wives  -  Doctor Boyfriend	 
  Jonathon Hyphen Jones  -  Spiraling Epsilon	 
  Rachel Twit  -  Ugly Day Of Rain And Soccer	 
  Ink Well Spinsters  -  Yank For The Rooties	 
  Mother Superior Gymnasium  -  Glad Girls [Early Version]	 
  Jonathon Hyphen Jones  -  (If You've Got A Rocket) Got To Ride	
  Human Possible, The  -  Frog Baby Axe Murderer

Disc 4
  Maximilian Kittykat  -  Strange Games	 
  Crowd, The  -  Thick And Thin	 
  Red Rubber Ballroom  -  When 2 Hours Seem Like 5	 
  Blazing Archetypes  -  Find A Wet Spot	 
  Zonker Zoon  -  I'm Just Doing My Job	 
  Jonathon Hyphen Jones  -  Contemporary Man (He Is Our Age) [Demo]	 
  Zeppelins Of Gin  -  Heels Tight	 
  Peccadilloes  -  The House Always Looks So Nice	 
  Franklin Ellsworth Bowie  -  Amazed [Power Of Suck Version]	 
  Crowd, The  -  Disappearing Act	 
  Manly Weathers  -  Rubber Man [Long Version]	 
  Target Larks  -  James Of Life	 
  Embry O's  -  The Jerking Clown	 
  Hospital  -  Psycho All The Time	 
  Flavor X  -  Throwing Down The Line	 
  Jonathon Hyphen Jones  -  Proof	 
  Strike Outs, The  -  Third Grade Aviator	 
  Witches Of Woodstock  -  She Likes Tea Rats [Live]	 
  Jonathon Hyphen Jones  -  Promo Brunette [Demo]	 
  Roonies, The  -  Just One Drop	 
  No Equal  -  Temporary Shutdown	 
  Offspeed Macaroni, The  -  Skin High	
  Jonathon Hyphen Jones  -  Your Cricket Is Rather Unique	 
  Anacrusis  -  Fame And Fortune	 
  Live Forever Foundation  -  High Treason

References

Guided by Voices compilation albums
2015 compilation albums